Gilles Pécout (born 2 December 1961) is a French historian, academic and diplomat.

Biography 
Pécout was born in Marseille. He graduated from the École normale supérieure in Paris, where he was also professor and director of the Department of History.

He holds the chair of Political and Cultural History of 19th century Italy and Mediterranean Europe at the Sorbonne.

He is known to the Italian public thanks to his participation in the RAI3 television program Il tempo e la storia and its sequel Passato e presente, of which he is also a member of the scientific committee.

On 15 September 2016, he was appointed rector of the Île-de-France Academic Region and rector of the Academy of Paris. In September 2020 he became Ambassador of France to Austria.

Works 
 Il lungo Risorgimento. La nascita dell'Italia contemporanea (1770–1922)  (Naissance de l'Italie contemporaine, 1770–1922), Bruno Mondadori, 2011, ISBN 9788861596153
 Curatore: Penser les frontières de l'Europe du XIXe au XXIe siècle, PUF, 2004
 Atlas de l'histoire de France, Autrement, 2007
 Grand Atlas de l'Histoire de France, sotto la direzione di Jean Boutier, con Olivier Guyotjeannin, Autrement, 2011

Honours

French honours

Foreign honours 
 Grand Officer of the Order of Merit of the Italian Republic – December 27, 2021

 Commander of the Order of Merit of the Italian Republic – December 27, 2006

References

External links 

 Treccani.it
 Sorbonne.fr

Commanders of the Order of Merit of the Italian Republic
Chevaliers of the Légion d'honneur
Living people
1961 births
21st-century French historians
20th-century French historians
Academic staff of the University of Paris
Ambassadors of France to Austria